This is a list of electoral results for the electoral district of Eyre in Western Australian state elections.

Members for Eyre

Election results

Elections in the 2010s

Elections in the 2000s

Elections in the 1990s

Elections in the 1980s

Elections in the 1950s

References

Western Australian state electoral results by district